Anatoliy Serhiyovych Tymofeyev (born 19 April 1992) is a Ukrainian professional footballer who plays as a goalkeeper for VPK-Ahro Shevchenkivka.

Career
Tymofeyev's first professional club was FC Dynamo Kyiv, but he played only for the reserve team FC Dynamo-2 Kyiv in the Ukrainian First League. He made his professional debut on 20 July 2013, in a home match against FC Oleksandriya. He then signed with FC Naftovyk-Ukrnafta Okhtyrka before moving to Georgian side FC Dinamo Batumi in July 2016, where he won the 2016 Umaglesi Liga. In June 2020, he moved to Cherkashchyna in the Ukrainian First League, where he played in a total of 11 matches.

FC Chernihiv 
On 23 October 2020, Tymofeyev moved to FC Chernihiv in the Ukrainian Second League. The next day, he made his debut for the side against FC Uzhhorod.

Polissya Zhytomyr 
On 1 July 2021 he moved to Polissya Zhytomyr in the Ukrainian First League.

Honours
Dinamo Batumi
 Umaglesi Liga: 2016

Dynamo Kyiv
Ukrainian Super Cup: 2011
Ukrainian Premier League: Runners-up 2011–12

References

External links
 Profile at FC Polissya Zhytomyr 
 
 
 
 

1992 births
Living people
Footballers from Kyiv
Ukrainian footballers
Association football goalkeepers
Ukrainian expatriate footballers
Expatriate footballers in Georgia (country)
Expatriate footballers in Belarus
Ukrainian expatriate sportspeople in Georgia (country)
FC Dynamo Kyiv players
FC Dynamo-2 Kyiv players
FC Naftovyk-Ukrnafta Okhtyrka players
FC Dinamo Batumi players
FC Smolevichi players
FC Cherkashchyna players
FC Chernihiv players
FC Polissya Zhytomyr players
Ukrainian First League players
Ukrainian Second League players
SC Poltava players